Alright! is a studio album by Bogdan Raczynski. It was released on Rephlex Records in 2007. It would be his final release for 12 years 
until "Rave 'Till You Cry."

Track listing

References

Further reading

External links
 

2007 albums
Bogdan Raczynski albums
Rephlex Records albums